Jaqueira is a city located in the state of Pernambuco, Brazil with an estimated (IBGE 2020) population of 11,644.

Geography
Jaqueira is located in the Brazilian state of Pernambuco, in the coastal Zona da Mata region. The city is 147 kilometers away from the state's capital city of Recife. It is bound by the Lagoa dos Gatos to the north, Maraial to the south, Catende to the east, and São Benedito do Sul to the west. The city has an area of 89.09 square kilometers, at an elevation of 143. The area has a humid, tropical climate, and Jaqueira's annual average temperature is 25.2° C. Near the city are the Una River and the Subcaducifólia forest.

Economy
The main economic activities in Jaqueira are based in agribusiness, particularly sugarcane and bananas.

Economic indicators

Economy by Sector
2006

Health indicators

References

Municipalities in Pernambuco